Manchester United Football Ground railway station, often known as the Old Trafford Halt or Manchester United FC Halt, is a railway station adjacent to Old Trafford football stadium in Stretford, Greater Manchester. It is on the southern Liverpool Lime Street-Manchester Piccadilly railway line, between Deansgate and Trafford Park.

Since 2018, matchday services to and from the station do not operate at the request of the club due to health and safety concerns.

Layout
The station was constructed by the Cheshire Lines Committee and opened on 21 August 1935. It was provided with one timber-built platform and was served, on match days only, by a shuttle service of steam-hauled trains from Manchester Central railway station. It was initially named United Football Ground, but was renamed Old Trafford Football Ground in early 1936. The date of change to the current name is not known.

Served only on matchdays, the station is directly adjacent to the Old Trafford football stadium and passengers leave the station by the stadium's South Stand. It is one of very few National Rail stations in Great Britain not to be included in the ORR station usage stats.

References
Notes

Bibliography

External links

Northern Rail Network Map (with MUF on)

Manchester United F.C.
Railway stations in Trafford
Former Cheshire Lines Committee stations
Railway stations in Great Britain opened in 1935
Former Northern franchise railway stations